Bandarupalle is a village in Guntur district of the Indian state of Andhra Pradesh. It is located in Tadikonda mandal of Guntur revenue division. It forms a part of Andhra Pradesh Capital Region.

The total population of the Village is around 5000 and total voting is 2833 as of 2019 General Elections. Bandarupalle is 10 km far away from Guntur city via Palakaluru road. Bandarupalle has a Railway Station but only passenger through trains has stopping and this was the only commute to villagers back until the 1980-1990s. Nowadays, the Bus and Auto facilities are available along with trains to commute to/from the village. The neighborhood villages are Perecharla, Mallavaram, Garikapadu, Ravela, Mandapadu, and Visidala.

Bandarupalli has Hindu, Christian, and Muslim religious people and temples. Jellamma thalli is known famous Hindu goddess and all of the village people has great belief in her irrespective of religious/caste. Village is famous for Devotion and has Sivalayam temple, Ramalayam temple, Lakshminarasimha swamy temple, veerabrahmendra swamy temple nice&pleasant view, and Lakshimi Thirupathamma Thalli Temple and Masjid for Muslims and couple Churches for Christians.

Villagers primary occupation is cultivation and major farming into Cotton, Chillis, Turmeric and Rice. Village has Nagarjuna sagar right branch canal on which farmers majorly depends for the farming.

Government and politics 

Bandarupalle gram panchayat is the local self-government of the village. It is divided into 12 wards and each ward is represented by a ward member. The ward members are headed by a Sarpanch.

Bandarupalle is part of Tadikonda(SC) assembly constituency and Guntur Parliament constituency.

See also 
List of villages in Guntur district

References 

Villages in Guntur district